Siah Siah-ye Sheykheh (also Romanized as Sīāh Sīāh-ye Sheykheh; also known as Sheykheh, Siahsia, Sīā Sīā, and Sīā Sīā-ye Sheykheh) is a village in Howmeh-ye Jonubi Rural District, in the Central District of Eslamabad-e Gharb County, Kermanshah Province, Iran. At the 2006 census, its population was 224, in 52 families.

References 

Populated places in Eslamabad-e Gharb County